Mediothele is a genus of South American funnel-web spiders that was first described by Robert John Raven & Norman I. Platnick in 1978.

Species
 it contains six species, all found in Chile:
Mediothele anae Ríos-Tamayo & Goloboff, 2012 – Chile
Mediothele australis Raven & Platnick, 1978 (type) – Chile
Mediothele lagos Ríos-Tamayo & Goloboff, 2012 – Chile
Mediothele linares Ríos-Tamayo & Goloboff, 2012 – Chile
Mediothele minima Ríos-Tamayo & Goloboff, 2012 – Chile
Mediothele nahuelbuta Ríos-Tamayo & Goloboff, 2012 – Chile

References

Hexathelidae
Mygalomorphae genera
Spiders of South America
Endemic fauna of Chile